The men's pole vault event at the 1998 World Junior Championships in Athletics was held in Annecy, France, at Parc des Sports on 2 August.

Medalists

Results

Final
2 August

Participation
According to an unofficial count, 16 athletes from 12 countries participated in the event.

References

Pole vault
Pole vault at the World Athletics U20 Championships